Yukamensky District (Jukamensk joros) is an administrative and municipal district (raion), one of the twenty-five in the Udmurt Republic, Russia. It is located in the northwest of the republic. Its administrative center is the rural locality (a selo) of Yukamenskoye. Population:  11,947 (2002 Census);  The population of Yukamenskoye accounts for 40.2% of the district's total population.

References

Notes

Sources

Districts of Udmurtia